Ioanna Papantoniou (Greek; Ιωάννα Παπαντωνίου, b. 1936) is a Greek author, scenic designer, costume designer and folklorist. She is the founder and president of the Peloponnesian Folklore Foundation in Nafplio, winner of the 1981 European Museum of the Year Award.

Life

Early life
Papantoniou was born in Athens in 1936. Her father was Vasilios Papantoniou, one of Kyknos Canning Company owners while her mother was descendant of a wealthy family. During the Axis occupation of Greece she lived with her family in Athens under difficult circumstances while her father was killed during Dekemvriana. During the 1950s she studied in a Finishing school in United Kingdom. She married at the age of 20, however, that marriage ended in divorce in 1966. She studied scenic and costume design at Wimbledon College of Art.

Work

Since 1971 Papantioniou made a notable professional career as a scenic and costume designer working along with Michael Elliott, Karolos Koun, Alexis Minotis, Katina Paxinou etc. She was the first female scenic designer of the National Theatre of Greece and Epidaurus' theatre.
From 1992 until 1996 Papantoniou was professor at the universities of Athens and Peloponnese.

From 1956 until the 1980s, Papantoniou carried an extensive fieldwork throughout Greece, Cyprus and the Griko communities of Italy, gathering data and documents about the traditional culture, music and dance and also about the preindustrial technology and old-fashioned children games. Ioanna Papantoniou is also the author of several publications about the Greek local costumes and fashion.

Peloponnesian Folklore Foundation
In 1974 she founded the Peloponnesian Folklore Foundation, a nonprofit cultural institution and museum based in Nafplion, in memory of her father Vasilios Papantoniou. For the needs of the institution, she donated to PFF almost her entire property, including her personal folklore collection. In 1981, PFF was awarded the European Museum of the Year Award.

Awards and honours
In 1982, Papantoniou was honoured by the National Academy of Athens for her contribution in arts and theatre. In 1987, she received an award during the Thessaloniki International Film Festival for her costume work for the film Doxombus. In 2013, Papantoniou was awarded with the Lifetime Achievement Award by the European Museum Academy.

References

Greek folklorists
Greek costume designers
Greek scenic designers
Writers from Athens
1936 births
Living people
Artists from Athens